Lago di Faetano is a small artificial lake opened in 1968 used for trout fishing near the border with Italy in the castello of Faetano near the road that connects Faetano with Rimini and not far from the Marano stream which also borders to the east the border with Italy.

References 

Bodies of water of San Marino
Reservoirs in Europe